Michael Donald Newcomb (December 20, 1952 – February 13, 2010) was an American psychologist. His research focused on drug etiology, as well as nuclear anxiety and other topics.

Early life and education 
Michael D. Newcomb was born on December 20, 1952, in Laguna Beach, California. In 1974, he earned a bachelor's degree in social ecology from University of California, Irvine. He completed joint studies in developmental psychology and mathematics. In 1976, he earned a master's degree in psychology from University of California, Los Angeles where he later completed a doctorate in clinical psychology in 1979. His doctoral advisor was Peter M. Bentler. He completed a clinical internship at the West Los Angeles VA Medical Center where he trained in therapies including family, sex, gestalt, and hypnotherapy.

Career 
In 1991, Newcomb started his work as a professor at USC Rossier School of Education where he stayed until his death in 2010. He became the chair of the University of Southern California counseling psychology program in 1992.

Awards and honors 
Newcomb was a fellow of the American Psychological Association, American Psychological Society, and the Western Psychological Association.

Personal life 
Newcomb died on February 13, 2010, in Santa Monica, California, after a long bout with a degenerative neurological disease.

Selected works

Articles

Books

References 

1952 births
2010 deaths
People from Laguna Beach, California
University of California, Irvine alumni
University of California, Los Angeles alumni
University of Southern California faculty
Fellows of the American Psychological Association
Fellows of the Association for Psychological Science
21st-century American psychologists
20th-century psychologists
20th-century American scientists
21st-century American scientists
Neurological disease deaths in California
Scientists from California